Producers Savings Banking Corporation, or simply Producers Bank, started operations on November 27, 1995 in San Jose City, Nueva Ecija. As of May 2022, Producers Bank has a total of two hundred fifty three (253) operating branches nationwide. It offers (I) deposit products such as savings account, ATM account, checking account, time deposit account, and foreign currency deposit unit (FCDU) account, (II) loan products like business loan, mortgage loan, agri/crop loan, auto loan and Teacher's Salary loan and (III) money transfer service via Western Union. Producers Bank envisions itself to be the number one (1) partner bank of entrepreneurs and farmers in producing more wealth for the country.

References

See also
Banco Dipolog

Banks of the Philippines
Banks established in 1995
Companies based in Pasig